Doğuş University (or simply Doğuş) is a foundation university located in Dudullu, Ümraniye, Istanbul.

Description

Doğuş University has twenty programmes in the faculties of Arts and Sciences, Engineering, Economics and Administrative Sciences, Arts and Design, together with nine associate degree programs in the School of Advanced Vocational Studies. Additionally, there are eight postgraduate education programs in the Institute of Social Sciences and three in the Institute of Science and Technology. The European Union Studies program in the Institute of Social Sciences is a member of the consortium IMPREST (International Masters Program in European Studies), which started its academic endeavour in the academic year 2006–2007 and actively cooperated with five other European universities, including Doğuş University.

Due to Doğuş University's ERASMUS (Erasmus University Charter) membership, which started in the spring term of the 2003–2004 academic year, students of Doğuş University can benefit from exchange programs under bilateral agreements signed with over 30 universities.

Campus
 Acıbadem, Kadıköy, Istanbul
 Hasanpaşa, Kadıköy, Istanbul

Academics

Faculty of Arts And Sciences

 Department of Communication Sciences
 Department of English Language and Literature
 Department of Mathematics
 Department of Psychology
 Division of Physics
 Division of Chemistry
 Division of Humanities

Faculty of Law
Law

Faculty of Economics And Administrative Sciences
Department of Business Administration: English and Turkish programmes
Department of International Relations
Department of Economics and Finance: English and Turkish programmes
Department of International Trade and Business

Faculty of Engineering
 Department of Computer Engineering: Computer Engineering Program, Information Systems Engineering Program
Department of Electronics and Communications Engineering: English and Turkish programmes
Department of Control Engineering
Department of Mechanical Engineering: English and Turkish programmes
Department of Industrial Engineering: English and Turkish programmes

Faculty of Fine Arts And Design
Department of Architecture
Department of Graphics
Department of Painting
Department of Industrial Product Design
Department of Interior Architecture
Visual Communication Design

Institute of Science & Technology
Doctorate: Logistics and Supply Chain Management Doctorate Program
Master: Computer and Information Sciences, Electronics and Communications Engineering, Engineering and Technology Management

Institute of Social Sciences
Doctorate: Financial Economics Doctorate Program
Master
Business Administration: English and Turkish programmes
 MA in European Union Studies
 MS in Financial Economics
 MA in English Language and Literature
 MA in Psychology
 MA in Communication Sciences

See also
Turkish universities

References

External links
 Doğuş University website

Universities and colleges in Istanbul
Educational institutions established in 1997
Private universities and colleges in Turkey
1997 establishments in Turkey